St. Mary's High School (SMHS) is a private, Roman Catholic high school located in the Roman Catholic Diocese of Colorado Springs, Colorado, United States. St. Mary's colors are kelly green and white, and its mascot is the Pirate.

Notable alumni

Ben F. Laposky, mathematician and artist
John Suthers (class of 1971), Mayor of Colorado Springs

External links

Notes and references

High schools in Colorado Springs, Colorado
Catholic secondary schools in Colorado
Roman Catholic Diocese of Colorado Springs
Educational institutions established in 1885
1885 establishments in Colorado